The 2022 Tibor Zsíros Férfi Magyar Kupa was the 64th season of the Hungarian Basketball Cup. Roko Badžim was named Most Valuable Player.

Qualification
Eight highest ranked teams after the first half of the 2021–22 NB I/A regular season qualified to the tournament.

Falco-Volvo Alpok Autó Szombathely
Szolnoki Olajbányász
DEAC-Tungsram
Duna Aszfalt-DTKH Kecskemét
Alba Fehérvár
Egis Körmend
HÜBNER Nyíregyháza BS
Naturtex-SZTE-Szedeák

Bracket

Quarterfinals

Semifinals

Final

See also

 2021–22 Nemzeti Bajnokság I/A

References

External links
 Official website 
 Hungarian Basketball Federaration 

Magyar Kupa men